The surname Tinker, originally an occupational surname for a "mender of pots and pans", may refer to:

People:
Carson Tinker (born 1989), American National Football League long snapper
Clarence L. Tinker (1887–1942), first Native American major general
Frank Glasgow Tinker (1909–1939), American mercenary pilot and top American ace in the Spanish Civil War
Grant Tinker (1925–2016), former chairman and CEO of the NBC television network, co-founder of MTM Enterprises and former husband of Mary Tyler Moore
Gerald Tinker (born 1951), American former track and field runner and National Football League player
HP Tinker (born 1969), British short story writer
Irene Tinker (born 1927), American Professor Emerita at the University of California, Berkeley
Jack Tinker (1938–1996), English theatre critic
Joe Tinker (1880–1948), American Hall-of-Fame Major League Baseball player
John Tinker (disambiguation)
Mark Tinker (born 1951), American television producer and director
Miles Tinker (1893–1977), American author and professor emeritus at the University of Minnesota 
Ronald Tinker (1913–1982), New Zealand World War II officer
Thomas Tinker (c.1581–1620/21), a passenger on the Mayflower

Fictional characters:
Beth Tinker, a character in the British soap opera Coronation Street
Sinead Tinker, the niece of Beth Tinker in Coronation Street
Alice Tinker, a character in British sitcom The Vicar of Dibley

Occupational surnames
English-language occupational surnames